Dorothea "Thea" Hochleitner (10 July 1925 – 11 May 2012) was an Austrian alpine skier who competed in the 1956 Winter Olympics.

She was born in Bad Gastein.

In 1956, she won the bronze medal in the giant slalom event. In the downhill competition, she finished seventh, and in the slalom contest, she finished twelfth.

External links 
Thea Hochleitner's profile at Sports Reference.com
Thea Hochleitner's obituary 

1925 births
2012 deaths
Austrian female alpine skiers
Olympic alpine skiers of Austria

Alpine skiers at the 1956 Winter Olympics
Olympic bronze medalists for Austria
Olympic medalists in alpine skiing
Medalists at the 1956 Winter Olympics
20th-century Austrian women
21st-century Austrian women